The Waco Showdown is a tournament for professional female tennis players. The event, played on outdoor hardcourts, is classified as a $80,000 ITF Women's Circuit tournament and has been held in Waco, Texas, since 2015.

Past finals

Singles

Doubles

External links
 ITF search
 Official website

ITF Women's World Tennis Tour
Hard court tennis tournaments in the United States
Sports in Waco, Texas
Recurring sporting events established in 2015
2015 establishments in Texas
Tennis tournaments in Texas